
Laguna Matuwal is a lake in the east part of Beni Department, Bolivia. Its surface area is 6.83 km² and a coastal perimeter of 10.1 kilometers.

Geography 
Matuwal lagoon is a Bolivian Amazon freshwater lagoon located near the town of Bella Vista.

References 

Lakes of Beni Department